Até que a Sorte nos Separe 2 ( Till Luck Do Us Part 2) is a 2013 Brazilian comedy film directed by Roberto Santucci and written by Paulo Cursino and Chico Soares. It is a sequel of the 2012 film Até que a Sorte nos Separe. Leandro Hassum who had played the protagonist in the previous film, back to reprise his role, while Danielle Winits who had played Jane in the previous film, was replaced by Camila Morgado. The film features a cameo by American actor Jerry Lewis.

Plot
After losing everything, Tino is more cash-strapped than ever, until he receives the news of the death of Olavo, the uncle of his wife Jane, and discovers that he left an inheritance of R$100 million, and then make a trip to Las Vegas. One night after he discovers that have lost everything and that owes money to the Mexican Mafia.

Cast
 Leandro Hassum as Tino
 Camila Morgado as Jane
 Julia Dalavia as Teté
 Jerry Lewis as Bellboy
 Rita Elmôr as Laura
 Anderson Silva as Andrew Silver
 Henry Fiuka as Juninho

Release

Box office
In its first weekend in theaters, the film took almost 550,000 people to theaters, the largest opening of a Brazilian production in 2013.

References

External links

2013 films
Brazilian comedy films
Films directed by Roberto Santucci
Films shot in Rio de Janeiro (city)
Films shot in the Las Vegas Valley
Brazilian sequel films
2013 comedy films
2010s Portuguese-language films